The Serra de Tramuntana is a mountain range running southwest–northeast which forms the northern backbone of the Spanish island of Mallorca. It is also the name given to the comarca of the same area. On 27 June 2011, the Tramuntana Range was awarded World Heritage Status by UNESCO as an area of great physical and cultural significance.

Geography 
The highest peak is the Puig Major, which at 1,436 meters, is the highest mountain in the Balearic Islands. The second highest peak is Penyal de Migdia which is at 1,398 meters. It is followed by the Puig de Massanella, which stands at 1,364 meters. The mountain range also host the deepest cave of Majorca, the Cova de sa Campana at -358 meters, and the deepest underground lake at -334 meters.

The climate in the Tramuntana Range is significantly wetter than the rest of the island, recording as much as 1507 mm (59.3 inches) of precipitation per year, in comparison with some other parts of the island where annual rainfall is less than 400mm (15 inch). It is also cooler due to the altitude, and a few days of snow are not unusual during winter.

The Serra de Na Burguesa is the southernmost portion of the Tramuntana Range.

Coll de Cal Reis 

Coll de Cal Reis is a mountain saddle in the Serra de Tramuntana range on the Ballearic Island of Mallorca. To the west of the saddle a ridge extends up to the highest point of the island, the Puig Major, whilst east of the saddle, there is only a minor side peak, the Moleta de Cals Reis.

The highway Ma-2141 leads over the saddle down to the beach town of Sa Calobra, one of the supposed most picturesque roads of Spain. The road is also a famous target for road cyclists.

Municipalities in the region 

Population as of January 1st 2021

Environmental protection 

In June 2011, the entire mountain range, which has been preserved as an important nature reserve, outstanding in their geology and forest cover and harboring a diversity of plant and animal species, away from rapid urbanization, was listed as a World Heritage Site by UNESCO. The UNESCO introductory statement refers to:

The Cultural Landscape of the Serra de Tramuntana located on a sheer-sided mountain range parallel to the north-western coast of the island of Mallorca. Millennia of agriculture in an environment with scarce resources has transformed the terrain and displays an articulated network of devices for the management of water revolving around farming units of feudal origins. The landscape is marked by agricultural terraces and inter-connected water works - including water mills - as well as dry stone constructions and farms.

References

External links 

 
 Serra de Tramuntana - UNESCO World Heritage status 2010, Cultural Landscape 
 Information on the Serra de Tramuntana 
 Serra de Tramuntana of Mallorca, World Heritage Site 
 walking route to experience the Dry Stone Route in Tramuntana Range - Mallorca 
 Serra de Tramuntana - Facebook
 Serra de Tramuntana - Twitter

Landforms of Mallorca
Tramuntana
Comarcas of the Balearic Islands
World Heritage Sites in Spain